George H.W. Bush is a 2008 two-part biographical television film about former United States President George H. W. Bush. Produced by PBS for the American Experience documentary program, it recounts Bush's life from his childhood and experience in World War II up to the end of his presidency in 1993. Written, co-produced, and directed by Austin Hoyt, the film aired on PBS in two parts on May 5 and 6, 2008.

Interviewees

Barbara Bush, first lady
Richard Darman, budget director
Marlin Fitzwater, press secretary
Mikhail Gorbachev
John Robert Greene, presidential historian
Doro Bush Koch, daughter
Timothy Naftali, biographer
Colin Powell, chairman, Joint Chiefs of Staff
Condoleezza Rice

Home media
George H.W. Bush was made available for streaming at the official American Experience "Presidents" website beginning on May 7, 2008. The film was later released on DVD by PBS on August 26, 2008. On the same day, it was also released in an American Experience DVD box set collecting its films about United States presidents.

References

External links
PBS official site

2008 television films
2008 films
2008 documentary films
American Experience
American television films
Documentary films about presidents of the United States
2000s English-language films
2000s American films